London Craft Week takes up residence in the capital early each May. This annual event showcases the very best international and British creativity and craftsmanship through a ‘beyond luxury’ journey-of-discovery. The curated programme brings together over 230 events from all corners of the globe fusing making, design, fashion, art, luxury, food, culture and shopping.

An accessible and immersive cultural experience, London Craft Week's visitors can eat, drink and view performances, meet artists, designers, makers and engineers, get a glimpse behind-the-scenes of famous brands and landmark buildings, see familiar products deconstructed, learn how things are made and even have a go themselves.

London Craft Week, as a small private not-for-profit organisation, supported by founding partner Vacheron Constantin and sponsors Grosvenor, The GREAT Campaign, Mulberry and St James's London.

The launch event for the London Craft Week was held in Bloomsbury in February 2015, and was attended by Prince Charles.

References

Crafts
Annual events in London
Recurring events established in 2015
2015 establishments in England